Alleene (also Aleene, Allene, Lawrenceville, Mineola, and Minneola) is an unincorporated community and census-designated place (CDP) in Little River County, Arkansas, United States. It was first listed as a CDP in the 2020 census with a population of 97.
 
The Will Reed Farm House, listed on the National Register of Historic Places, is located in Alleene.

Demographics

2020 census

Note: the US Census treats Hispanic/Latino as an ethnic category. This table excludes Latinos from the racial categories and assigns them to a separate category. Hispanics/Latinos can be of any race.

References

Unincorporated communities in Little River County, Arkansas
Unincorporated communities in Arkansas
Census-designated places in Little River County, Arkansas
Census-designated places in Arkansas